Leopoldo Savona (1922–2000) was an Italian actor, director, choreographer, and screenwriter. He directed 18 films between 1954 and 1976. He was sometimes credited as Leo Colman or Leo Coleman.

Life and career
Born in Lenola, Latina, he started his career in 1949 as assistant director of Giuseppe De Sanctis. He made his directorial debut in 1955, with the adventure film Il principe dalla maschera rossa. He collaborated with  Pier Paolo Pasolini as a technical adviser in Mamma Roma.

Selected filmography
Screenwriter and director
 The Prince with the Red Mask (1955)
 Warriors Five (1960)
 The Mongols (1961)
 Arms of the Avenger (1963)
 Death Falls Lightly (1972)
 Byleth: The Demon of Incest (1972)
 The Two Orphans (1976)

Actor
 Finishing School (1953)
 The Giant of Metropolis (1961)

References

External links

1922 births
2000 deaths
Italian film directors
Italian male screenwriters
People from the Province of Latina
20th-century Italian male writers
20th-century Italian screenwriters